Deltapodus is an ichnogenus of footprint produced by a stegosaurian dinosaur According to the main Stegosauria article:

"Purported stegosaurian dermal plate was reported from the latest Cretaceous (Maastrichtian) Kallamedu Formation (southern India); however, Galton & Ayyasami (2017) interpreted the specimen as a bone of a sauropod dinosaur. Nevertheless, the authors considered the survival of stegosaurians into the Maastrichtian to be possible, noting the presence of the stegosaurian ichnotaxon Deltapodus in the Maastrichtian Lameta Formation (western India).".

It is known from the Lourinhã Formation of Portugal, Spain, from the Tugulu Group China, Morocco and United Kingdom.

Deltapodus includes three ichnospecies: D. ibericus, D. curriei, and D. brodricki. It has been suggested that Deltapodus curriei may be registrations by Wuerhosaurus stegosaurs.

See also
 List of dinosaur ichnogenera

References

Further reading
 

Dinosaur trace fossils
Fossils of China
Fossils of Morocco
Jurassic Portugal
Fossils of Portugal
Lourinhã Formation
Fossils of Spain
Fossils of Great Britain
Stegosaurs